Frederik Arnoldus "Frits" Flinkevleugel (3 November 1939 – 10 April 2020) was a Dutch footballer who played as a right back.

Career
Born in Amsterdam, Flinkevleugel played for DWS and FC Amsterdam. He won the Dutch championship in 1964 with DWS.

He also earned 11 caps for the Dutch national team between 1964 and 1967.

Later life and death
Flinkevleugel owned a cigar shop in Amsterdam. He died of COVID-19 on 10 April 2020, aged 80.

References

1939 births
2020 deaths
Dutch footballers
Netherlands international footballers
AFC DWS players
FC Amsterdam players
Eredivisie players
Eerste Divisie players
Association football fullbacks
Footballers from Amsterdam
Deaths from the COVID-19 pandemic in the Netherlands